Punct may refer to:

Punct (magazine), Romanian art magazine
PÜNCT, two-player strategy board game